The foothill elaenia (Myiopagis olallai) is a species of bird in the family Tyrannidae. It is found in Ecuador and Peru. Its natural habitat is subtropical or tropical moist montane forests. It is threatened by habitat loss.

References

Further reading
On Planet of Birds

foothill elaenia
Birds of the Ecuadorian Andes
Birds of the Peruvian Andes
foothill elaenia
foothill elaenia
Taxonomy articles created by Polbot